Private James Frazer is a fictional Home Guard platoon member and undertaker, first portrayed by John Laurie in the BBC television sitcom Dad's Army. He is noted for his catchphrases "We're doomed!" and "Rubbish!"

Personality 
Frazer was born in 1872 and is a dour, trouble-stirring, exaggerating, wild-eyed Scottish undertaker (formerly the keeper of a philatelist's shop with a hobby of making coffins). He hails from the "wild and lonely" Isle of Barra in the Outer Hebrides, an apparently desolate and bleak place that appears to have informed most of his pessimistic, dark tendencies.

He is an old sailor and traveller who claims to have had many adventures in the south seas, describing in Uninvited Guests how an expedition with a friend named Jethro led to Jethro being cursed to die by a witch doctor for stealing a ruby from a jungle temple, and recounting in Don't Forget the Diver how another friend, Wally Stuart, died from "the dreaded bends" when they were diving for pearls, leading to Frazer inheriting his diving suit. He was awarded the Polar Medal for serving on the Shackleton Expedition - which one is not made clear but it would have been the 1907-09 Nimrod expedition since the 1914-16 Endurance expedition members would not have been back in time to partake in the battle of Jutland, and no Polar Medals were awarded for the 1921-22 Quest expedition.  Typically he describes the Antarctic as "a wild and lonely place with nothing but ice and snow" - which is why the medal ribbon was white. He was a Chief Petty Officer in the Royal Navy during the First World War and was a cook on board HMS Defiant during the Battle of Jutland. He also mentions that he was a member of the crew of a minesweeper and was responsible for shooting mines with a rifle from the ship and is shown to be a crack shot due to that (although he has to wave the gun up and down, because as he says "It's the only way I can shoot sir, this is the motion of the sea"). He moved to Walmington-on-Sea after the First World War, becoming the town's undertaker.

Frazer makes no secret of his desires for increased rank and power within the platoon. To that end, Frazer is frequently negative and hyper-critical of his superior officers and their decisions, and clearly considers Captain Mainwaring, Sergeant Wilson and Lance Corporal Jones barely fit for command. When given even a little bit of power, however (or even just the taste of it), it frequently goes straight to his head; notably, in the episode "If the Cap Fits...", Frazer is temporarily given command of the platoon for a few days as an exercise in the difficulties of leadership, which, far from educating him in the pressures that Mainwaring faced, merely result in him acting even more exceedingly arrogant and tyrannical than before. In When Did You Last See Your Money?, a panic-stricken Jones was going to pieces over a missing £500, and Frazer was delighted, reminding people that he was next in line for Jones' position. In Something Nasty in the Vault, after Jones assumes control of the platoon following Mainwaring and Wilson's incapacitation, Frazer declares that he is second in command; something which goes undisputed by the rest of the platoon. Furthermore, in the missing episode A Stripe for Frazer, Frazer is promoted to Lance-Corporal by Mainwaring, who has been informed that he can promote a member of the platoon to a full corporal's rank. By promoting Frazer, Mainwaring's plan is to determine whether Jones or Frazer will make the best full corporal; however, Frazer's desire for the second stripe leads him to issue numerous charge sheets (including against Jones, his fellow lance corporal) in an effort to impress Mainwaring, with minor offences being designated as very serious breaches of conduct.

To reach his ends, Frazer is somewhat two-faced; he has a Machiavellian tendency to doubt people and their situations, and is usually responsible for gossiping and sowing the seeds of unease or insubordination amongst the other members of the platoon. His is usually the loudest voice of condemnation or criticism in any given situation - however, if and when his current target triumphs or is validated, he will instantly alter his position with a hasty "I never doubted you for a second", to ensure that he is never on the losing side. A prime example of this is his attitude in the episode "Branded", where his is the loudest voice of condemnation regarding Private Godfrey's conscientious objection and apparent 'cowardice' during the First World War, only for Frazer to immediately change his position when it transpires that Godfrey is nevertheless a decorated war hero. Another, less prominent, example is in "Sgt - Save My Boy!"; Frazer criticises Godfrey for fleeing "at the first sign of trouble", only to dub him "a man of steel... just like I've always said" when he sees Godfrey bypass the mine-infested beach on his own. In the episode "Getting the Bird", Frazer even shows a rare hint of self-awareness about his tendency to gossip; when he discovers that the young lady Wilson has been seen around town with is actually Wilson's daughter from a failed marriage, he admits that he's "an old blatherskite" and promises Wilson that he will never divulge his secret.

A notoriously miserable and miserly soul, Frazer is known for his bleak, pessimistic outlook on life. In any situation where circumstances seem bleak for the platoon, he will never fail to find more reasons to feel doom. He will often find the time in the various predicaments that the platoon face to observe that their potential fate is "a terrible way to die", to note that "we're doomed" when peril is awaiting them or to regale the platoon with an anecdote of a much similar experience he is aware of that ended rather bleakly for all concerned. He also has quite a line in dark, atmospheric and rather long-winded tales which start promisingly with the lure of supernatural horrors and terrors, only to ultimately prove disappointing and end rather mundanely, such as the tales of 'The Auld Empty Barn' (there was nothing in it) and his friend Jethro, who apparently fell victim to a curse that ensured certain death; Jethro indeed did die at the age of 86.

It was revealed in the episode "Operation Kilt" that he sports a tattoo on his arm which he claims "cost a fortune" and states "Scotland forever". It's also revealed in "When Did You Last See Your Money?" that he knows hypnosis, as he says "While I was sailing the China seas, I studied the art of hypnosis" and successfully hypnotises Lance-Corporal Jones. His main rivalries are with the other ageing members in the platoon, notably Corporal Jones, who fights back, and Private Godfrey, who does not. He has a more amenable relationship with Private Walker, who jokingly gives Frazer the nickname "Taffy" (a slang term for Welsh people, used by Walker as a playful dig at Frazer's Scottish heritage). He possesses a curious fascination with women who have "big, strong thighs."

Frazer does show a more generous side to his character when he saves Private Godfrey's cottage from being demolished to make way for a runway. When all hope seems lost, Frazer saves the day by threatening to reveal a senior politician's past indiscretions, although in typical Frazer style he does not let on that he was the hero of the hour.

It is also reported that Frazer is President of the local Caledonian Society (he is the only one in it after he threw the other member out, for not paying his subscription when Frazer increased it).

There are many misunderstandings with the Verger, for example in When Did You Last See Your Money? when the Verger sees him hypnotizing Lance Corporal Jones and believes he is practising black magic.

Notes

References

Dad's Army characters
Fictional Scottish people
Fictional World War I veterans
Fictional undertakers
Fictional misers
Television characters introduced in 1968